The Hawaiian stilt (Himantopus mexicanus knudseni) is an endangered Hawaiian subspecies of the black-necked stilt (H. mexicanus) species. It is a long-legged, slender shorebird with a long, thin beak. Other common names include the Hawaiian black-necked stilt, the aeʻo (from a Hawaiian name for the bird and word for stilts), the kukuluaeʻo (a Hawaiian name for the bird and word for “one standing high”), or it may be referred to as the Hawaiian subspecies of the black-necked stilt.

Taxonomy
The Hawaiian stilt is usually classified as a subspecies of the black-necked stilt, Himantopus himantopus knudseni, or even as its own species, Himantopus knudseni.

Description
It has a black back from head to tail, with a white forehead, face, and underside. Its bill is thin, long and black, and its legs are very long and pink.
Sexes are similar, except that the female has a tinge of brown on its back, while the male's back is glossy.

In proportion to its body, the Hawaiian stilt has the second-longest legs of any other species of bird. Its eyebrows, cheeks, chin, breast, belly and vent are white. Immature birds have a brownish back and a cheek patch like the adult black-necked stilt. Downy chicks are well camouflaged in tan with black speckling. Young look identical to both black-necked and black-winged stilts.

Compared to the nominate subspecies, the North American H. m. mexicanus, the black coloration of the Hawaiian stilt extends noticeably farther around its neck and lower on its face than the black-necked stilt (Himantopus mexicanus), and its bill, tarsus, and tail are longer.

Behavior
The Hawaiian stilt show strong, flapping flight with dangling legs. They are found in groups, pairs or singly.

They have a loud chirp described as sounding like "kip kip kip".

Breeding

The stilts nest in loose colonies on mudflats close to the water. Nests are shallow depressions lined with stones, twigs and debris. An average clutch is four eggs. Soon after hatching, young leave the nest to accompany adults on their daily foraging. Adults will aggressively defend their territories and will feign injury to distract potential predators from their nest sites and young.

Feeding
The Hawaiian stilt's feeding habitats are shallow bodies of water, providing a wide variety of fish, crabs, worms, and insects.

Distribution and habitat

An estimated 92% of the Hawaiian stilt population is on Maui, Oahu, and Kauai, with annual presence on Niihau, Molokai, and Hawaii, and rare observation on Lanai (1993 estimate).

The Hawaiian stilt occurs locally on all the main Hawaiian islands, and there are still breeding populations on Maui, O'ahu and Kaua'i where it is fairly common. It is uncommon on Moloka'i and Lana'i, and scarce on Hawai'i. Many of Kauai's birds migrate to Ni'ihau during wet winters. The stilts are most often seen in wetlands near the ocean on the main islands. They may occur in large groups on ponds, marshes and mudflats.

Status and conservation
The subspecies is LE (Listed Endangered) in the US Endangered Species Act (USESA), and its NatureServe Conservation Status was ranked G5T2 in 1996, meaning the species is globally secure (G5), but the Hawaiian subspecies is imperiled (T2). The population is estimated to be slightly increasing since it was included in the USESA in 1967. According to state biannual waterbird surveys, population estimates varied between 1,100 and 1,783 between 1997 and 2007.

Conservation programs are protecting populations and breeding grounds, and also establishing additional populations to reduce risk of extinction. The state of Hawaii and the US Fish and Wildlife Service have protected 23% of the state's coastal wetlands.

Threats
The Hawaiian stilt, like many of Hawaii's native endemic birds, is facing extensive conservation threats. In the past 250 years, many animals have been introduced to the Hawaiian islands. Primary causes of historical population decline are loss and degradation of wetland habitat, and introduced predators such as rats, dogs, cats, and mongooses. Other causes included introduced plants and fish, bullfrogs, disease, and environmental contaminants. Native predators include the pueo and black-crowned night heron. The Hawaiian stilt was a popular game bird until waterbird hunting was banned in Hawaii in 1939.

References

Himantopus
Endemic birds of Hawaii
Endangered fauna of Hawaii
Birds described in 1887
Taxa named by Leonhard Stejneger